Afrodisiac is a funk/soul album by the Main Ingredient. Released in 1973 by RCA Records, the album features several songs written or co-written by Stevie Wonder.

Track listing

Personnel
Bert De Coteaux - arranger, conductor
Buzz Willis - production supervisor
Acy R. Lehman - art direction
Nick Sangiamo - photography

Charts

Singles

References

External links
 

1973 albums
The Main Ingredient (band) albums
RCA Records albums